Pickering may refer to:

Places

Antarctica 
 Pickering Nunataks, Alexander Island

Australia 
 Pickering, South Australia, the original name (1872–1940) of the town of Wool Bay
 Pickering Brook, Western Australia, Australia

Canada 
 Pickering, Ontario
 Pickering Village, Ontario

England 
 Pickering, North Yorkshire
 Pickering Beck, North Yorkshire
 Vale of Pickering, North Yorkshire
 Lake Pickering, a former lake

United States 
 Pickering, Missouri
 Pickerington, Ohio
 Pickering, Pennsylvania
 Pickering Township, Bottineau County, North Dakota
 Mount Pickering, California
 Pickering Creek, Pennsylvania, a tributary of the Schuylkill River
 Pickering Passage, Washington, a strait
 Fort Pickering, Massachusetts, a 17th century fort on the National Register of Historic Places
 Fort Pickering (Memphis, Tennessee), a Confederate fort in the American Civil War

Outer space 
 Pickering (lunar crater)
 Pickering (Martian crater)

People and fictional characters 
 Pickering (surname), a list of people and fictional characters
 Pickering Phipps, three related people in England in the 18th to 20th centuries

Schools 
 Pickering College, Newmarket, Ontario, Canada
 Pickering High School (disambiguation), several schools in various countries

Sports 
 Pickering FC, a Canadian soccer team
 Pickering Panthers, a Junior "A" ice hockey team from Pickering, Ontario, Canada
 Pickering Town F.C., an English football team

Other uses 
 Pickering's Defense, a chess opening
 , an American schooner
 Pickering House (disambiguation), several houses
 Pickering Operations Complex, a skyscraper on Pickering Street in Singapore
 Pickering Interfaces, a British test and measurement company
 Pickering and Company, an American phonograph cartridge manufacturer, predecessor of Stanton Magnetics
 Pickering baronets, two extinct titles, one in the Baronetage of Nova Scotia, the other in the Baronetage of England
 Pickering Medal, a New Zealand honour for promoting commercial success

See also 
 Pickering emulsion, an emulsion stabilized by solid particles
 Pickering scale, a rating of astronomical seeing
 "Pickering test" in First Amendment law - see Pickering v. Board of Education